Super cyclonic storm is the highest category used by the India Meteorological Department (IMD) to classify tropical cyclones, within the North Indian Ocean tropical cyclone basin between the Malay Peninsula and the Arabian Peninsula. Within the basin, a super cyclonic storm is defined as a tropical cyclone that has 3-minute mean maximum sustained wind speeds of at least . The category was formally introduced during the 1999 season alongside Very Severe Cyclonic Storms, in order to replace the previously used Severe Cyclonic Storm with Core of Hurricane Winds. There have been at least nine storms that have attained such an intensity. The most recent super cyclonic storm was Cyclone Amphan in 2020 North Indian Ocean cyclone season.

Background
The North Indian Ocean tropical cyclone basin is located to the north of the Equator, and encompasses the Bay of Bengal and the Arabian Sea, between the Malay Peninsula and the Arabian Peninsula. The basin is officially monitored by the India Meteorological Department's Regional Specialized Meteorological Centre in New Delhi. Within the basin a Super Cyclonic Storm is defined as a tropical cyclone, that has 3-minute mean maximum sustained wind speeds of at least . The category was introduced during 1999 alongside Very Severe Cyclonic Storms in order, to replace the previously used Severe Cyclonic Storm with Core of Hurricane Winds. Should a Super Cyclonic Storm impact land at or near its peak intensity, then it is expected to cause large scale flooding and extensive structural damage to residential and industrial buildings as well as bridges. It is also expected to disrupt communications and the power supply as well as large-scale disruption to rail and road traffic.

Systems

Climatology

See also

List of Category 5 Atlantic hurricanes
List of Category 5 Pacific hurricanes
List of very intense tropical cyclones

Notes

References

Super cyclonic storms
NIO SUCS